Report to Murphy is an American television sitcom starring Michael Keaton that aired on CBS from April 5 to May 31, 1982.

Synopsis
The series is about the everyday problems and frustrations of a parole officer, as he deals with the released prisoners that come and go.  The theme music was composed by JAM Creative Productions in Dallas, Texas who are best known for creating jingle imaging for TV and radio stations.

Cast
Michael Keaton as Murphy
Donnelly Rhodes as Charlie
Margot Rose as Baker
Olivia Cole as Blanche
Donna Ponterotto as Lucy

Episodes
Six episodes are registered with the United States Copyright Office.

References

External links 

1982 American television series debuts
1982 American television series endings
1980s American sitcoms
CBS original programming
English-language television shows